The Hollywood Post Alliance Award for Outstanding Editing - Television (Over 30 Minutes) is an annual award, given by the Hollywood Post Alliance, or HPA, to post production workers in the film and television industry, in this case film editors. While television editors have been awarded since 2006, the category first marked a distinction between half-hour series and series longer than that in 2018.

Winners and nominees
 † – indicates a winner of a Primetime Emmy Award for Editing.
 ‡ – indicates a nomination for a Primetime Emmy Award for Editing.

2000s
Outstanding Editing - Television

2010s

Outstanding Editing - Television (Over 30 Minutes)

Programs with multiple awards

3 awards
 Breaking Bad (AMC)

2 awards
 Downton Abbey (PBS)
 Stranger Things (Netflix)
|}

Programs with multiple nominations

8 nominations
 Game of Thrones (HBO)

6 nominations
 Breaking Bad (AMC)

4 nominations
 Dexter (Showtime)

3 nominations
 Downton Abbey (PBS)
 Glee (Fox)
 House of Cards (Netflix)
 Stranger Things (Netflix)

2 nominations
 Foo Fighters: Sonic Highways (HBO)
 Westworld (HBO)

See also

 List of American television awards

References

American television awards